Ou Chum is a commune in Ou Chum District in north-east Cambodia. It contains eight villages and had a population of 3,090 in 1998. In the 2007 commune council elections, all five seats went to members of the Cambodian People's Party. The NGO Forum on Cambodia reported in 2006 that the land alienation rate in Ou Chum was high. (See Ratanakiri Province for background information on land alienation.)

Villages

References

Communes of Ratanakiri province